The Our Lady of Peace Cathedral or La Paz Cathedral is a Catholic church in the center of the city of La Paz, Baja California Sur, western Mexico that is the seat of the Diocese of La Paz. It is located where the mission was founded by the Jesuits in the eighteenth century.

The current church was built in the second half of the 19th century, under the orders of Bishop Francisco Francisco Escalante y Moreno.

A neoclassical style on the outside, it has a façade and twin towers, as often used since Romanesque architecture throughout the Spanish Empire.

The interior of the temple has beautiful baroque altarpieces from the 18th century, which come from other missions that were abandoned.

See also
Roman Catholicism in Mexico
Our Lady of Peace Cathedral

References

Roman Catholic cathedrals in Mexico
Roman Catholic churches completed in 1865
19th-century Roman Catholic church buildings in Mexico